The 1983 season was Molde's 21st season in the second tier of Norwegian football and their first since their relegation from 1. divisjon in 1982. This season Molde competed in 2. divisjon group B and the Norwegian Cup.

In the league, Molde finished group B in 1st position, 5 points ahead of runners-up Strindheim.

Molde participated in the 1983 Norwegian Cup. They were knocked out by Kristiansund in the Second Round. The team lost 1–2 away at Kristiansund and were eliminated from the competition.

Squad
Source:

Friendlies

Competitions

1. divisjon

Results summary

Positions by round

Results

League table

Norwegian Cup

Squad statistics

Appearances and goals
Lacking information:
Appearance statistics from Norwegian Cup rounds 1–2 (4–6 players in round 1 and 11–13 players in round 2) and the goalscorer in round 2 are missing.

 

|}

Goalscorers

See also
Molde FK seasons

References

External links
rsssf.no

1983
Molde